Daughter of Time may refer to:

Daughter of Time (album), 1970 album by Colosseum
Daughter of Time Trilogy,  omnibus of the novels Reader, Writer, and Maker by Erec Stebbins
The Daughter of Time, 1951 novel by Josephine Tey